is a dam in the Gifu Prefecture of Japan.

Dams in Gifu Prefecture